Avinash Pandey is an Indian politician belonging to the Indian National Congress party. He has been a Youth Congress leader and held the post of General Secretary in the Indian Youth Congress when Shri Maninder Singh Bitta was the President. He has been a Member of the Legislative Council, Maharashtra (Upper House), and was appointed chairman, of Maharashtra State Small Scale Industries Development Corporation (MSSIDC).

He unsuccessfully fought the Rajya Sabha elections from Maharashtra in 2008, against industrialist Rahul Bajaj. He was defeated by Rahul Bajaj by one vote for Rajya Sabha.

He was again nominated to contest in June 2010 Rajya Sabha from Maharashtra. He won the election unopposed.

On 25 January 2022, he was appointed as the General Secretary of the Indian National Congress Incharge - Jharkhand by Congress President Sonia Gandhi.

He is the Congress party's All India Congress Committee (AICC) General Secretary Incharge - Jharkhand and a Congress Working Committee (CWC) member.

Positions held

1985-89: Member, Maharashtra Legislative Assembly 
1986: Member, Maharashtra State Mathadi Board Member, Consultative Committee for the Ministry of Industry 
1986-87: Chairman, Public Undertakings Committee, Maharashtra Legislative Assembly 
1987: Member, Accommodation Committee, Maharashtra Legislative Assembly Chairman, Minimum Wages Committee for Bidi Workers, Member, India's 40th year of Independence Celebration Committee 
1987-88: Member, Maithilisharan Gupt Centenary Committee 
1988: Member, Nagpur University Senate, Member, Jawaharlal Nehru Centenary Celebration Committee 
2006-10: Chairman, Maharashtra Small Scale Industries Development Corporation Ltd. 
Jul-2010: Elected to Rajya Sabha July 2010 onwards Member, Consultative Committee for the Ministry of Coal Permanent Special Invitee, Consultative Committee for the Ministry of Human Resource Development Aug. 2010 onwards Member, Committee on Urban Development Sept. 2010 onwards Member, Committee on Petitions Member, Hindi Salahkar Samiti for the Ministry of Panchayati Raj Member, Governing Council of the National Mission of Sarva Shiksha Abhiyan Member, Development Council for Sugar Industries

Books published

In Hindi: Compiled and coordinated: (i) Shabd Swar Ke Sumeru (A Book on Rashtra Kavi Pradeep), 1995 and (ii) Ek Deep Kavi Pradeep (A compilation of Memoirs of Rashtra Kavi Pradeep), 2007

Other positions

Elected General Secretary, Nagpur University Students Council, 1977–78; President, (i) Maharashtra N.S.U.I. (I), 1983–1987, and (ii) Maharashtra Youth Congress, 1988–1989; Vice-president, Maharashtra Pradesh Congress Committee (I), 2002–2005; General Secretary, (i) Indian Youth Congress (I), 1993–97 and (ii) Maharashtra Pradesh Congress Committee (I), 1998–2002; Secretary, All India Congress Committee since 2009; Chief Convener, Historic National Convention of NSUI at Nagpur, 1984; Member, Training Department A.I.C.C., 2007

References

External links
Official website

Indian National Congress politicians from Maharashtra
Living people
Marathi politicians
Rajya Sabha members from Maharashtra
Maharashtra MLAs 1985–1990
Politicians from Nagpur
1958 births